David Durand (1680 – 16 January 1763) was a Huguenot French and English minister and historian. He was born in Languedoc and fled France to the Netherlands before heading to Spain with a group of refugees, being captured at the Battle of Almanza in 1707 and being sent to France and then escaping to the Netherlands again. He was a minister in Rotterdam and became a friend of Pierre Bayle's there.

He moved to England in 1711 and served as a pastor to the Church of England French-speaking churches in London.  He became a Fellow of the Royal Society in 1728.  During his time in England, he wrote many works in French, most of them history.  His continuation of Paul de Rapin's History of England (1734) was the most successful of his works.  Although it was written for a French audience, it was the most authoritative history of England for some years.  He also wrote histories of the 16th century, of Classical painting, and a literary work where he attempted a French-language imitation of John Milton's Paradise Lost.  He never married, and died in 1763.

References
Marzials, F. T. and Geoffrey Treasure.  "David Durand" In Matthew, H.C.G. and Brian Harrison, eds.  The Oxford Dictionary of National Biography.  vol. 17, 381.  London: OUP, 2004.

1680 births
1763 deaths
18th-century French historians
18th-century British historians
18th-century English Anglican priests
Fellows of the Royal Society
French male non-fiction writers
Huguenots